Shear stress (often denoted by  (Greek: tau)) is the component of stress coplanar with a material cross section. It arises from the shear force, the component of force vector parallel to the material cross section.  Normal stress, on the other hand, arises from the force vector component perpendicular to the material cross section on which it acts.

General shear stress
The formula to calculate average shear stress is force per unit area.:

where:
 = the shear stress;
 = the force applied;
 = the cross-sectional area of material with area parallel to the applied force vector.

Other forms

Wall shear stress
Wall shear stress expresses the retarding force (per unit area) from a wall in the layers of a fluid flowing next to the wall. It is defined as:

Where  is the dynamic viscosity,  the flow velocity and  the distance from the wall.

It is used, for example, in the description of arterial blood flow in which case which there is evidence that it affects the atherogenic process.

Pure
Pure shear stress is related to pure shear strain, denoted , by the following equation:

where  is the shear modulus of the isotropic material, given by

Beam shear
Beam shear is defined as the internal shear stress of a beam caused by the shear force applied to the beam.

where
 = total shear force at the location in question;
 = statical moment of area;
 = thickness (width) in the material perpendicular to the shear;
 = moment of inertia of the entire cross-sectional area.
The beam shear formula is also known as Zhuravskii shear stress formula after Dmitrii Ivanovich Zhuravskii who derived it in 1855.

Semi-monocoque shear

Shear stresses within a semi-monocoque structure may be calculated by idealizing the cross-section of the structure into a set of stringers (carrying only axial loads) and webs (carrying only shear flows). Dividing the shear flow by the thickness of a given portion of the semi-monocoque structure yields the shear stress. Thus, the maximum shear stress will occur either in the web of maximum shear flow or minimum thickness

Constructions in soil can also fail due to shear; e.g., the weight of an earth-filled dam or dike may cause the subsoil to collapse, like a small landslide.

Impact shear
The maximum shear stress created in a solid round bar subject to impact is given by the equation:

where
 = change in kinetic energy;
 = shear modulus;
 = volume of rod;
and
;
;
;
 = mass moment of inertia;
 = angular speed.

Shear stress in fluids

Any real fluids (liquids and gases included) moving along a solid boundary will incur a shear stress at that boundary. The no-slip condition dictates that the speed of the fluid at the boundary (relative to the boundary) is zero; although at some height from the boundary the flow speed must equal that of the fluid. The region between these two points is named the boundary layer. For all Newtonian fluids in laminar flow, the shear stress is proportional to the strain rate in the fluid, where the viscosity is the constant of proportionality. For non-Newtonian fluids, the viscosity is not constant. The shear stress is imparted onto the boundary as a result of this loss of velocity.

For a Newtonian fluid, the shear stress at a surface element parallel to a flat plate at the point  is given by:

where
 is the dynamic viscosity of the flow;
 is the flow velocity along the boundary;
 is the height above the boundary.

Specifically, the wall shear stress is defined as:

Newton's constitutive law, for any general geometry (including the flat plate above mentioned), states that shear tensor (a second-order tensor) is proportional to the flow velocity gradient (the velocity is a vector, so its gradient is a second-order tensor):

and the constant of proportionality is named dynamic viscosity. For an isotropic Newtonian flow it is a scalar, while for anisotropic Newtonian flows it can be a second-order tensor too. The fundamental aspect is that for a Newtonian fluid the dynamic viscosity is independent on flow velocity (i.e., the shear stress constitutive law is linear), while non-Newtonian flows this is not true, and one should allow for the modification:

This no longer Newton's law but a generic tensorial identity: one can always find an expression of the viscosity as function of the flow velocity given any expression of the shear stress as function of the flow velocity. On the other hand, given a shear stress as function of the flow velocity, it represents a Newtonian flow only if it can be expressed as a constant for the gradient of the flow velocity. The constant one finds in this case is the dynamic viscosity of the flow.

Example
Considering a 2D space in cartesian coordinates (x,y) (the flow velocity components are respectively (u,v)), then the shear stress matrix given by:

represents a Newtonian flow, in fact  it can be expressed as:
,

i.e., an anisotropic flow with the viscosity tensor:

which is nonuniform (depends on space coordinates) and transient, but relevantly it is independent on the flow velocity:

This flow is therefore newtonian. On the other hand, a flow in which the viscosity were:

is nonnewtonian since the viscosity depends on flow velocity. This nonnewtonian flow is isotropic (the matrix is proportional to the identity matrix), so the viscosity is simply a scalar:

Measurement with sensors

Diverging fringe shear stress sensor
This relationship can be exploited to measure the wall shear stress. If a sensor could directly measure the gradient of the velocity profile at the wall, then multiplying by the dynamic viscosity would yield the shear stress. Such a sensor was demonstrated by A. A. Naqwi and W. C. Reynolds. The interference pattern generated by sending a beam of light through two parallel slits forms a network of linearly diverging fringes that seem to originate from the plane of the two slits (see double-slit experiment). As a particle in a fluid passes through the fringes, a receiver detects the reflection of the fringe pattern. The signal can be processed, and knowing the fringe angle, the height and velocity of the particle can be extrapolated. The measured value of wall velocity gradient is independent of the fluid properties and as a result does not require calibration.
Recent advancements in the micro-optic fabrication technologies have made it possible to use integrated diffractive optical element to fabricate diverging fringe shear stress sensors usable both in air and liquid.

Micro-pillar shear-stress sensor

A further measurement technique is that of slender wall-mounted micro-pillars made of the flexible polymer PDMS, which bend in reaction to the applying drag forces in the vicinity of the wall. The sensor thereby belongs to the indirect measurement principles relying on the relationship between near-wall velocity gradients and the local wall-shear stress.

Electro-Diffusional method
The Electro-Diffusional method measures the wall shear rate in the liquid phase from microelectrode under limiting diffusion current condition. A potential difference between an anode of a broad surface (usually located far from the measuring area) and the small working electrode acting as a cathode leads to a fast redox reaction. The ion disappearance occurs only on the microprobe active surface, causing the development of the diffusion boundary layer, in which the fast electro-diffusion reaction rate is controlled only by diffusion. The resolution of the convective-diffusive equation in the near wall region of the microelectrode lead to analytical solutions relying the characteristics length of the micro-probes, the diffusional properties of the electrochemical solution and the wall shear rate.

See also
 Critical resolved shear stress
 Direct shear test
 Friction
 Shear and moment diagrams
 Shear rate
 Shear strain
 Shear strength
 Tensile stress
 Triaxial shear test

References

Continuum mechanics